Châteauneuf-Val-Saint-Donat is a commune in the Alpes-de-Haute-Provence department in southeastern France.

Population

See also
Communes of the Alpes-de-Haute-Provence department

References

Communes of Alpes-de-Haute-Provence
Alpes-de-Haute-Provence communes articles needing translation from French Wikipedia